Forces Financial was established in 1999 and is based in Suffolk with its company headquarters situated in Ipswich. It has around 180,000 members in the police and military in three UK locations and 16 military branches including Germany and Cyprus. It employs 140 people in three UK locations - Ipswich, Hook in Hampshire and Hessle in Yorkshire

In February 2014, Police Mutual acquired Forces Financial for an undisclosed fee. Police Mutual is a mutual society, providing Serving and Retired Police Officers, Police Staff and their families with financial products.

Forces Financial sponsor Army Hockey, a part of the MoD sport compensation scheme.

References

White, Kevin. "Police Mutuals acquires Forces Financial". http://www.ftadviser.com/
Josling, Patsy. "Army Compensation - sport, Forces Financial". http://www.armyhockey.org/index.html
Tombs, Mathew. "Forces Financial acquired by Police Mutual". http://pwc.blogs.com/midlands/
Atkin, Joanne. "Police Mutual acquires Forces Financial". http://www.mortgagefinancegazette.com/

Financial services companies established in 1999
Insurance companies of the United Kingdom
1999 establishments in England